The Adoration of the Magi  is an oil painting on wood panel by Netherlandish artist Hieronymus Bosch, executed around 1475. It is housed in the Metropolitan Museum, New York, US. A prominent feature of this painting is the strong perspective effect and also the copious use of gold leaf, which is not very typical for Bosch. The pigments employed are red lake, azurite, lead-tin-yellow and ochres.

The precise authorship of this panel is and has been disputed, but in 2016 the Bosch Research and Conservation Project attributed it to Bosch based on evidence in the underdrawing.

See also
The Epiphany, Bosch
Adoration of the Magi (Bosch, Philadelphia)

References

Sources

Further reading

 Matthijs Ilsink, Jos Koldeweij, Hieronymus Bosch: Painter and Draughtsman – Catalogue raisonné, Yale University Press, New Haven and London 2016, pp 216–223

External links

 Metropolitan museum
 Netherland Institute for Art History

Paintings by Hieronymus Bosch
Bosch
Paintings in the collection of the Metropolitan Museum of Art
1470s paintings
Angels in art
Cattle in art
Dogs in art
Black people in art